Big Heaven is a summit in McCone County, Montana, in the United States.

References

Mountains of McCone County, Montana
Mountains of Montana